Kosovo-Albanian rapper Mozzik has released two studio albums, a collaborative album, 42 singles as a lead artist and 5 as a featured artist.

Albums

Studio albums

Collaborative albums

Singles

As lead artist

2010s

2020s

As featured artist

Other charted songs

References 

Discographies of Albanian artists